Manny Curtis (born Emanuel Kurtz; November 15, 1911 – December 6, 1984) was an American songwriter. He wrote the lyrics for over 250 songs, including "In a Sentimental Mood" (1935) and "Let It Be Me" (1957).  He was born in Brooklyn, New York, United States and died in San Francisco, California, United States.

He also used the pseudonyms Mann Curtis, Manny Curtis and Manny Kurtz.

External links
Manny Kurtz at JazzBiographies

1911 births
1984 deaths
Musicians from Brooklyn
Jewish American musicians
Songwriters from New York (state)
20th-century American musicians
20th-century American Jews